Govindaraja Temple may refer to:

Govindaraja Perumal Temple, a temple in Cuddalore, Tamil Nadu, India
Govindaraja Temple, Tirupati, a temple in Tirupati, Andhra Pradesh, India